Jérémy Gavanon (born 20 September 1983) is a French former professional footballer who played as a goalkeeper. An Olympique de Marseille youth product, he made his professional debut with the club in 2002. Following a loan at Clermont Foot and a three-year stint with FC Sochaux in which he rarely featured, Gavanon went on to make 142 league appearances for AS Cannes in five years.

Club career
Born in Marseille, Gavanon signed a professional contract with Olympique de Marseille in the summer of 2003, and made his first start for the club in a UEFA Champions League group match against FK Partizan, which resulted in a 1–1 draw and a place in the UEFA Cup. He also appeared in the 2004 UEFA Cup Final against Valencia as a substitute, after Barthez was sent off. He made only ten league appearances in two years, however, and with the signing of Fabien Barthez, the club decided to loan out Gavanon to Clermont to gain some first-team experience. He made 22 league appearances for Clermont during the 2005–06 season.

Gavanon transferred to Sochaux after the season ended. He was on the bench as Sochaux won the 2007 Coupe de France Final. On 29 May 2009, FC Sochaux released the goalkeeper along with defenders Olivier Thomas and Hakim El Bounadi and Brazilian-born Tunisian international striker Francileudo Santos.

International career
Gavanon was also a regular player for the France U21 national team, and he was a member of the 24-man squad selected for the European Under-21 Football Championship, held in the summer of 2006.

Honours
Individual
 Toulon Tournament Best Goalkeeper: 2004

References

External links
 
 
 
 

1983 births
Living people
French footballers
France under-21 international footballers
Association football goalkeepers
Olympique de Marseille players
Clermont Foot players
FC Sochaux-Montbéliard players
AS Cannes players
Ligue 1 players
Ligue 2 players
Championnat National players